Snapping Shoals Creek is a stream in the U.S. state of Georgia. It is a tributary to the South River.

Some say Snapping Shoals Creek was so named for fish which could be easily caught or "snapped" at a shoal, while others believe the swift river current caused this name to be selected. Variant names are "Shoals Creek" and "Snapping Shoal Creek".

References

Rivers of Georgia (U.S. state)
Rivers of Newton County, Georgia
Rivers of Rockdale County, Georgia